The 1995 Castella Classic British Open was a professional ranking snooker tournament, that was held from 1–9 April 1995 at the Plymouth Pavilions, Plymouth, England.
 
John Higgins won the tournament by defeating the defending champion Ronnie O'Sullivan nine frames to six in the final.


Main draw

Final

References

British Open (snooker)
1995 in snooker
1995 in British sport